Luis Manuel Blanco (born 13 December 1953) is an Argentine football coach and former player, who currently manages College 1975 in the Gibraltar Football League.

He was formerly the head coach of the Indonesia national team. His stay in Indonesia was brief, as he was replaced by Rahmad Darmawan after less than a month and no matches.

In April 2020, he was hospitalised after contracting COVID-19 and spent five days in a coma. A few weeks later, it was announced that he had recovered.

References

External links
 
 
 Official website

1953 births
Living people
Association football forwards
Argentine footballers
Boca Juniors footballers
Club Atlético Tigre footballers
chicago Sting players
Toronto Blizzard (1971–1984) players
Argentine football managers
Club Atlético Platense managers
C.D. Veracruz managers
Club Atlético Belgrano managers
Deportivo Español managers
Independiente Rivadavia managers
Godoy Cruz Antonio Tomba managers
Gimnasia y Esgrima de Jujuy managers
C.D. Jorge Wilstermann managers
FK Dinamo Tirana managers
Indonesia national football team managers
Club Aurora managers
Kategoria Superiore managers
Mons Calpe S.C. managers
Gibraltar National League managers
Argentine expatriate football managers
Expatriate football managers in Mexico
Argentine expatriate sportspeople in Mexico
Expatriate football managers in Bolivia
Argentine expatriate sportspeople in Bolivia
Expatriate football managers in Costa Rica
Argentine expatriate sportspeople in Costa Rica
Expatriate football managers in Venezuela
Argentine expatriate sportspeople in Venezuela
Expatriate football managers in Albania
Argentine expatriate sportspeople in Albania
Expatriate football managers in Paraguay
Argentine expatriate sportspeople in Paraguay
Expatriate football managers in China
Argentine expatriate sportspeople in China
Expatriate football managers in Indonesia
Argentine expatriate sportspeople in Indonesia
Expatriate football managers in Gibraltar
Argentine expatriate sportspeople in Gibraltar